Guillermo Almada is a fictional character in the 2012 Argentine telenovela Graduados. He is played by Juan Gil Navarro.

Fictional biography
Guillermo Almada was a high school student in the 1980s, friend of the school bully Pablo Catáneo. He came out of the closet during a reunion of former students, and was supported by everybody, except Pablo. Victoria Lauría, who used to have a crush on him, stayed as his friend, and helped him with his partner's daughter. Guillermo Almada got married by the end of the series.

Character creation and reception
Juan Gil Navarro usually works in dramas, and accepted to work in a comedy telenovela after a suggestion of his wife.
 
The character starred the first fictional same-sex marriage in Argentina, which had been legalized a short time before.

References

Graduados characters
Fictional gay males
Television characters introduced in 2012
Fictional LGBT characters in television